Torah Day School of Houston is a Jewish Day School in Houston established in 1977 by the Texas Regional Headquarters of the Chabad Lubavitch. It offers a Jewish education to grades K-8 in addition to its Early Childhood Center for children ages eighteen months through four years old.

About

Rabbi Shimon Lazaroff opened the school along with parents  in an attempt to provide quality Jewish and general studies education for the Houston Jewish Community.

For over thirty years its students have received a traditional Jewish education, comprehensive in scope, and a simultaneous general studies program.

The dual curriculum eliminates the need for after school religious classes as it provides daily Judaic learning experiences for pre-school through eighth grade students.

Accreditation & Affiliations
Texas Alliance of Accredited Private Schools (TAAPS)
National Accreditation Board of Merkos - Central Organization for Jewish Education
The Jewish Federation of Greater Houston
A beneficiary of the United Jewish Campaign
Torah Umesorah - National Society for Hebrew Day Schools

Administrative Staff
Rabbi Shimon Lazaroff - Head of School
Mrs. Chiena Lazaroff - Director
Rabbi Enan Francis - Principal and Assistant Head of School 
Eileen Kaplan - Head of Early Childhood Development Program

See also

 History of the Jews in Houston

References

External links
Torah Day School of Houston Website
Chabad Lubavitch Center - 2007 Building Expansion Project

Chabad in the United States
Jews and Judaism in Houston
Orthodox Jewish educational institutions
Jewish day schools in Texas
Chabad schools
Private K–8 schools in Houston
Educational institutions established in 1977
1977 establishments in Texas